Comedy Nights With Kapil is an Indian Hindi-language sketch comedy and celebrity talk show hosted and produced by comedian Kapil Sharma. It was on-air on Colors TV amid 22 June 2013 to 24 January 2016. Many of the episodes feature celebrity guests who usually appear to promote their latest films in a comedy-focused talk show format. On 25 September 2013, a fire broke out on the sets of the show at Film City in Goregaon causing the entire set to collapse and an estimated loss of 20 Crores. Following the fire, two episodes were shot on sets of Bigg Boss in Lonavla. In September 2013, the show became India's highest rated scripted TV show. At the CNN-IBN Indian of the Year awards, Sharma was awarded the Entertainer of the Year award for 2013.

After a successful run of three years, Kapil Sharma decided to wind up the show after differences with the channel Colors TV. The last episode aired on 24 January 2016. In August 2016, Colors started to re-telecast old episodes of the show in their Sunday afternoon time slots due to low Target rating points besides stiff competition with Kapil.

The show is adapted in Kannada as Majaa Talkies and hosted by Srujan Lokesh. This show is aired on Colors Kannada, the Kannada Channel owned by Colors TV.

Cast

Main cast

 Kapil Sharma as Host / Bittu Sharma / Sittu / Kapil / Inspector Shamsher Singh/ Various Characters
 Navjot Singh Sidhu as permanent guest
 Ali Asgar as Dolly Sharma / Chinky Sharma Dadi
 Sumona Chakravarti as Manju Sharma, Bittu's wife
 Upasana Singh as Pinky Sharma 
 Sunil Grover as Gutthi / Khairatilal / Kapil's father in law / Various characters
 Kiku Sharda as Palak / Lachha / Pankhudi / Pam /various characters
 Chandan Prabhakar as Raju / Chadda uncle 
 Paresh Ganatra as Kapil's brother-in-law / Various characters
 Roshni Chopra as Various characters
 Naveen Bawa as Various characters
 Atul Parchure as Various characters
 Sugandha Mishra as Bittu's sister-in-law/various characters

Recurring

 Naseem Vicky as Ramu / Various characters
 Vishal Singh as Mango Crorepati
 Rajiv Thakur as Various characters
 Razzak Khan as Golden Bhai
 Krishna Bhatt as various characters 
 Gaurav Gera as Dulari
 Raju Srivastava as beautician Rosie / various characters 
 Akshat Singh as Dhamaka
 Soni Singh as Bittu's secretary
 Rahul Mahajan as Nawab Pandey
 Parvati Sehgal as various characters.

List of episodes

Incident
On 3 April 2014, an audience scam was exposed of this show, when a NRI lady revealed to that she paid 8,000 rupees to see show, Preeti Simoes, this show's executive producer said some freelance coordinator did the scam with multiple people and their shows audience isn't paid but they select random people on Facebook and Twitter and invite them for shows shoot.

Awards

References

External links
 
 

Indian television sketch shows
Hindi-language television shows
2013 Indian television series debuts
Colors TV original programming
Indian stand-up comedy television series